Owusu Kwabena (born 18 June 1997), simply known as Owusu, is a Ghanaian professional footballer who plays as a forward for Ferencváros and the Ghana national team.

Club career
Owusu was born in Accra, and moved to Spain in 2016. After having trials at Racing de Santander and AD Alcorcón B, he joined CD Toledo on loan in August, being initially assigned to the reserves in Tercera División.

Owusu made his senior debut on 31 August 2016, coming on as a second-half substitute and scoring all of his team's goals in a 2–0 home win against UB Conquense, for the season's Copa del Rey. He subsequently became a regular starter for the club, scoring eight goals as his side missed out promotion in the play-offs.

On 23 August 2017, Owusu signed a five-year deal with La Liga side CD Leganés. Eight days later, he was loaned to Real Oviedo in Segunda División, for one year.

Owusu made his professional debut on 9 September 2017, replacing Carlos Hernández in a 1–1 away draw against Sporting de Gijón. After eight league appearances, his loan was cut short the following 3 January, and he joined FC Cartagena on loan just hours later.

On 24 July 2018, Owusu was loaned to Salamanca CF still in the third division, for one year. On 21 August of the following year, he moved to fellow league team Córdoba CF, also in a temporary deal.

On 23 January 2020, Azerbaijani club Qarabağ FK announced the signing of Owusu on a three-and-a-half-year contract.

On 31 January 2023, Owusu signed a two-year contract with Hungarian club Ferencvárosi TC.

International career
Owusu made his debut for Ghana national team on 15 June 2019 in a friendly against South Africa. He was selected for their 2019 Africa Cup of Nations squad.

Career statistics

Club

International

Honours 
Qarabağ

 Azerbaijan Premier League: 2019–20
Ankaragücü

 TFF First League: 2021–22

References

External links

1997 births
Living people
Footballers from Accra
Ghanaian footballers
Association football forwards
Ghana international footballers
2019 Africa Cup of Nations players
Segunda División players
Segunda División B players
Tercera División players
Azerbaijan Premier League players
CD Toledo players
CD Leganés players
Real Oviedo players
FC Cartagena footballers
Córdoba CF players
Qarabağ FK players
Ghanaian expatriate footballers
Ghanaian expatriate sportspeople in Spain
Expatriate footballers in Spain
Ghanaian expatriate sportspeople in Azerbaijan
Expatriate footballers in Azerbaijan